A T-code is a transaction code used whenever executing particular task . Each function in SAP ERP has an SAP transaction code associated with it .

Use
A transaction code is used to access functions or running programs (including executing ABAP code) in the SAP application more rapidly. By entering a t-code instead of using the menu, navigation and execution are combined into a single step, much like shortcuts in the Windows OS. SAP transaction codes can be entered into the Transaction code field to navigate the user directly to the screen or program task bypassing the SAP menu.

Example
Users can create a new session and start a new transaction in one step by entering /o followed by the transaction code e.g. /oFB60.

Example Transaction codes

MM01   creation of Material Master

XK01(BP)   Creation of Vendor Master

XD01(BP)    creation of Customer Master

FB60	Accounts Payable Invoice Entry

FB65	Accounts Payable Credit Note Entry

FK10N	Display Accounts Payable Balances

The transaction for MM module starts with M. 
 
IH09 - Display Material
MM01 - Create Material
MM02 - Change Material
MM03 - Display Material
MM50 - List Extendable Materials
MMBE - Stock Overview
MMI1 - Create Operating Supplies
MMN1 - Create Non-Stock Material 
MMS1 - Create Service
MMU1 - Create Non-Valuated Material
 
ME51N - Create Purchase Requisition
ME52N - Change Purchase Requisition
ME53N - Display Purchase Requisition
ME5A - Purchase Requisitions: List Display
ME5J - Purchase Requisitions for Project
ME5K - Requisitions by Account Assignment
MELB - Purch. Transactions by Tracking No.
 
ME56 - Assign Source to Purch. Requisition
ME57 - Assign and Process Requisitions
ME58 - Ordering: Assigned Requisitions
ME59 - Automatic Generation of POs
 
ME54 - Release Purchase Requisition
ME55 - Collective Release of Purchase Reqs.
ME5F - Release Reminder: Purch. Requisition
 
MB21 - Create Reservation
MB22 - Change Reservation
MB23 - Display Reservation
MB24 - Reservations by Material
MB25 - Reservations by Account Assignment
 
MB1C - Other Goods Receipts
MB90 - Output Processing for Mat. Documents
 
MB21 - Create Reservation
MB22 - Change Reservation
MB23 - Display Reservation
MB24 - Reservations by Material
MB25 - Reservations by Account Assignment
 
MBRL - Return Delivery per Mat. Document
 
MB1C - Other Goods Receipts
MB90 - Output Processing for Mat. Documents
 
MB1B - Transfer Posting
 
MIBC - ABC Analysis for Cycle Counting
 
MI01 - Create Physical Inventory Document
MI02 - Change Physical Inventory Document
MI03 - Display Physical Inventory Document
MI31 - Batch Input: Create Phys. Inv. Doc.
MI32 - Batch Input: Block Material
MI33 - Batch Input: Freeze Book Inv.Balance
MICN - Btch Inpt:Ph.Inv.Docs.for Cycle Ctng
MIK1 - Batch Input: Ph.Inv.Doc.Vendor Cons.
MIQ1 - Batch Input: PhInvDoc. Project Stock
 
MI01 - Create Physical Inventory Document
MI02 - Change Physical Inventory Document
MI03 - Display Physical Inventory Document
MI31 - Batch Input: Create Phys. Inv. Doc.
MI32 - Batch Input: Block Material
MI33 - Batch Input: Freeze Book Inv.Balance
MICN - Btch Inpt:Ph.Inv.Docs.for Cycle Ctng
MIK1 - Batch Input: Ph.Inv.Doc.Vendor Cons.
MIQ1 - Batch Input: PhInvDoc. Project Stock
 
MI01 - Create Physical Inventory Document
MI02 - Change Physical Inventory Document
MI03 - Display Physical Inventory Document
MI31 - Batch Input: Create Phys. Inv. Doc.
MI32 - Batch Input: Block Material
MI33 - Batch Input: Freeze Book Inv.Balance
MICN - Btch Inpt:Ph.Inv.Docs.for Cycle Ctng
MIK1 - Batch Input: Ph.Inv.Doc.Vendor Cons.
MIQ1 - Batch Input: PhInvDoc. Project Stock
 
MI21 - Print physical inventory document
 
MI04 - Enter Inventory Count with Document
MI05 - Change Inventory Count
MI06 - Display Inventory Count
MI09 - Enter Inventory Count w/o Document
MI34 - Batch Input: Enter Count
MI35 - Batch Input: Post Zero Stock Balance
MI38 - Batch Input: Count and Differences
MI39 - Batch Input: Document and Count
MI40 - Batch Input: Doc., Count and Diff.
 
MI08 - Create List of Differences with Doc.
MI10 - Create List of Differences w/o Doc.
MI20 - Print List of Differences
 
MI11 - Physical Inventory Document Recount
 
MI07 - Process List of Differences
MI37 - Batch Input: Post Differences

See also
 SAP R/3
 SAP NetWeaver
 SAP implementation

References

SAP SE